The 2002 Potters Holidays World Indoor Bowls Championship  was held at Potters Leisure Resort, Hopton on Sea, Great Yarmouth, England, from 08-26 January 2002.

In the singles Tony Allcock completed a shock victory. Unseeded and unfancied the Englishman’s win equalled the record of three title wins by David Bryant and Richard Corsie.
In the pairs Hugh Duff & Paul Foster defeated Greg Harlow & Graham Robertson in the final.

The women's singles competition took place in Belfast from April 18–20. The title was won by Carol Ashby.

Notes
A new scoring format was introduced; a game would now consist of two sets of nine ends. If the two sets resulted in draw (one set each) then a deciding set of just three ends would be played to determine the winner.

Winners

Draw and results

Men's singles

Men's Pairs

Women's singles

References

External links
Official website

World Indoor Bowls Championship
2002 in bowls